The 1946 Copa del Generalísimo Final was the 44th final of the Copa del Rey. The final was played at the Montjuïc, Barcelona, on 9 June 1946, being won by Real Madrid CF, who beat Valencia CF 3–1.

Details

References

1946
Copa
Valencia CF matches
Real Madrid CF matches
June 1946 sports events in Europe
1940s in Barcelona
1946 in Catalonia
Sports competitions in Barcelona